Ischnodoris is a moth genus in the subfamily Autostichinae.

Species
 Ischnodoris sigalota Meyrick, 1911
 Ischnodoris chlorosperma Meyrick, 1929

References

Autostichinae